Legbo may be,

Legbo language
Idris Legbo Kutigi